Maria Ulyanova may refer to:

 Maria Alexandrovna Ulyanova (1835–1916), mother of Vladimir Lenin
 Maria Ilyinichna Ulyanova (1878–1937), younger sister of Vladimir Lenin